Direcţia Generală de Protecţie şi Anticorupţie (General Directorate for Protection and Anti-corruption, DGPA; known before as Serviciul Intern de Protecţie şi Anticorupţie- Internal Service for Protection and Anti-corruption, SIPA) was the secret service of the Ministry of Justice of Romania.

It was disbanded in 2006.

See also
 SRI
 SIE
 SPP
 STS
 DGIA
 DGIPI

Defunct Romanian intelligence agencies
Anti-corruption agencies